Géza Kucsera (born 20 September 1948) is a politician and community representative in Serbia. A member of the country's Hungarian national minority community, he served in the Assembly of Vojvodina from 2000 to 2004 and was the mayor of Subotica from 2003 to 2008. During his time in public life, Kucsera was a member of the Alliance of Vojvodina Hungarians (Vajdasági Magyar Szövetség, VMSZ).

He is now a member of Serbia's Hungarian National Council.

Early life and private career
Kucsera was born in Dobričevo, in the municipality of Bela Crkva, Vojvodina, in what was then the People's Republic of Serbia in the Federal People's Republic of Yugoslavia. He graduated from Subotica's Teacher Training College, initially worked as a teacher, and was a school principal in Subotica from 1978 to 1992. In the latter year, he was required to return to teaching in the classroom – due, he has said, to ethnic discrimination under Slobodan Milošević's rule. He is now retired.

Politician

Local politics
The VMSZ won a plurality victory in Subotica in the 1996 Serbian local elections. When the municipal government was established in early 1997, Kucsera was appointed to the executive council with responsibility for education. The VMSZ subsequently participated in the 2000 local elections as part of the Democratic Opposition of Serbia (Demokratska opozicija Srbije, DOS), a broad and ideologically diverse coalition of parties opposed to Milošević's administration. The DOS won a landslide victory in Subotica; Kucsera was elected to the municipal assembly and was then re-appointed to his prior role on council. He was promoted to chair of the executive committee in May 2002 and served in this role until May 2003, when he was appointed as president of the municipal assembly, a position that was at the time equivalent to mayor.

Serbia introduced the direct election of mayors in the 2004 local elections. Kucsera ran as the VMSZ's candidate and was narrowly elected in the second round over Oliver Dulić of the Democratic Party. He served in this role for the next four years. As mayor, he sought decentralize the administration by introducing paid municipal secretaries in each local community.

The country subsequently abandoned direct mayoral elections, and Kucsera was not a candidate at the local level in 2008.

Provincial politics
Kucersa was elected to the Vojvodina assembly for Subotica's third division in the 2000 provincial election, which was held concurrently with the local elections. The DOS won a landslide victory, and Kucsera served as a supporter of the administration.

Vojvodina introduced a system of mixed proportional representation for the 2004 provincial election. Kucsera appeared in the thirty-fourth position on the VMSZ's electoral list; the party won six proportional seats, and he was not given a mandate. (During this period, proportional mandates were assigned to candidates on the electoral lists at the discretion of the sponsoring parties or coalitions. Kucsera's specific list position had no bearing on his chances of election.) He ran in Subotica's first division in the 2008 provincial election and was defeated in the second round.

At the republic level
Kucsera received the fifty-first position on the VMSZ's list in the 2007 Serbian parliamentary election. The list won three seats, and he did not receive a mandate. (As at the provincial level, parliamentary mandates were awarded in this period to sponsoring parties or coalitions rather than to individual candidates, and it was common practice for mandates to be assigned out of numerical order. Kucsera could have been chosen as part of his party's assembly delegation notwithstanding his list position.)

Serbia's electoral system was reformed in 2011, such that mandates were awarded in numerical order for candidates on successful lists. Kucsera was given the 120th position on the VMSZ's list for the 2012 parliamentary election. This was too low a position for election to be a reasonable prospect, and he was not elected when the list won five mandates.

He was expelled from the VMSZ in 2016, against the backdrop of a significant purge within the party.

Hungarian National Council
Kucsera has also served on Serbia's Hungarian National Council at different times. He appeared in the fourth position on the "Hungarian Movement" list in the 2018 council elections and was elected when the list won five mandates. He is now a member of the council's committee on the use of languages.

Electoral record

Provincial (Vojvodina)

Municipal (Subotica)

References

1948 births
Living people
People from Bela Crkva
Politicians from Subotica
Members of the Assembly of Vojvodina
Mayors of places in Serbia
Members of the Hungarian National Council (Serbia)
Alliance of Vojvodina Hungarians politicians